The Barmah National Park, formerly Barmah State Park, is a national park located in the Hume region of the Australian state of Victoria. The park consists of river red gum floodplain forest, interspersed with treeless freshwater marshes. The area is subject to seasonal flooding from natural and irrigation water flows.

The  Barmah-Millewa Forest, consisting of the Barmah Forest (Victoria) and the Millewa group of forests (New South Wales), forms the largest river red gum forest in the world.
The Barmah Forest Ramsar site is an internationally recognised wetland, listed under the Ramsar Convention, and a number of bird species that utilise the Barmah National Park are part of the Japan-Australia Migratory Bird Agreement (JAMBA) and the China-Australia Migratory Bird Agreement (CAMBA). Note that the areas of the Barmah National Park and the Barmah Forest Ramsar site mostly overlap, but are not identical, Barmah National Park site includes the western part of Ulupna Island in the north east, but not the Murray River Park to the south east. The Barmah Forest Ramsar site boundary does not include Ulupna Island, but does include the Murray River Park to the south east. The overall area of the red gum forest on the Victorian side is colloquially defined as the Barmah Forest.

Barmah National Park is a popular camping, walking, fishing, boating and canoeing and swimming destination.

Climate 
The Barmah National Park is known as a temperate semi-arid region, with low rainfall and high evaporation.

History 
The Barmah Forest was originally utilised by Indigenous Australians, including the Yorta Yorta and Bangerang people, to find food, shelter and materials. Following the settlement of Europeans into the area, Barmah Forest became an important fishing and logging area, with surrounding land cleared for agriculture and grazing. Rabbits, foxes, sheep, cattle and horses were introduced into the area. Hardwood timber was harvested from the Barmah region from around 1870, and logging of river red gum and seasonal cattle grazing were important local industries until recently, ceasing when the national park was created. The Barmah muster yards, located in the southern end of the park, and used for management of cattle grazed in the surrounding river red gum forests, were heritage listed in 2009. Cattle grazing was banned in all river red gum national parks in 2015.
The park contains a large population of wild horses, which mainly originate from free roaming horses that either escaped or were purposely released for breeding stock in the mid 1800s. Stock released by a local trotting horse breeder after 1952 bolstered their population after the last great roundup of 1949, when approximately 70 wild horses remained in the Barmah Forest.

Barmah State Park was established in 1987, and was legislated as Barmah National Park in 2010. The park is one of four river red gum national parks  established by the Victorian Government in 2010  to protect remnant river red gum forest. 
The other river red gum national parks are the Gunbower National Park (created 2009), Hattah-Kulkyne National Park (1978), Lower Goulburn National Park (2009), Murray-Sunset National Park (1991) and the Warby-Ovens National Park (2009).

In July 2010, the Government of New South Wales declared the Millewa Forest, on the northern banks of the Murray River, as a national park. The  forest was renamed as the Murray Valley National Park, making the combined reserves a  crossborder national park, managed by both governments and the Traditional Owners. The combined parks are the largest continuous red gum forest in the world.

Changes to flooding 

The Barmah Choke and the Narrows, a section of the Murray River where flow is restricted by a geological fault (the Cadell Fault), naturally cause the overflow of water into the Barmah Forest when the river flow is high.

Historically, the Barmah National Park and surrounding river red gum forests would flood naturally in winter and spring in most years, and river flows were very low in late-summer and autumn. Since clearing for agriculture and the subsequent dam construction took place, the Murray River has undergone extensive flow regulation. The construction of dams upstream from the Barmah National Park, from the 1920s onwards, has had a vast impact on the water flowing in the Murray River and instances of flooding, the flow of water is now highly regulated.
The Hume Dam was operational from 1936, the Yarrawonga Weir in 1939, and the Dartmouth Dam from 1979.

As a consequence of flow regulation, the winter and spring floods are now reduced, and of shorter duration than previously, with more low level flooding occurring in summer and autumn. The increased incidences of smaller summer and autumn floods, which affect low-lying areas of Barmah National Park, are sometimes caused by heavy rains. More often, they occur because there is sufficient rainfall for irrigated farmland between the Hume Dam and the Barmah Forest, consequently river diverters do not choose to take allocated water, Lake Mulwala (Yarrawonga Weir) also has inadequate storage, resulting in high level river flows referred to as "rainfall rejections".

These unseasonal high level river flows result in unseasonal flooding  in the Barmah-Millewa Forest, which has a significant effect on forest and wetland ecology, degrading wetlands by interfering with the natural drying-out phase and by disrupting nutrient cycling processes. In recent years, unseasonal flooding is being controlled, and "environmental water" is being released to offset some of the detrimental effects of river regulation on the ecosystems along the lower reaches of the Murray River. Management of environmental water supplied through the Murray-Darling basin to the Barmah–Millewa Forest is complex, and mainly under the control of the Murray-Darling Basin Authority. In Victoria the Victorian Environmental Water Holder also manages environmental water allocations.

The supply of environmental water to Barmah Forest aims to:

 Enhance the health of river red gum communities and aquatic vegetation in the wetlands and watercourses and on the floodplain, and promote the growth of floodplain marsh vegetation communities, particularly the extent of Moira grass
 Maintain or increase available habitat for frogs and turtles
 Provide feeding and nesting habitat for colonial nesting waterbirds
 Provide native fish with access to a range of floodplain, riverine and refuge habitats including by delivering variable flows that promote spawning 
 Enable nutrient cycling (particularly carbon) between the floodplain and river through connectivity Provide early-season flushing of the lower floodplain to cycle nutrients during cooler conditions and reduce the risk of poor water quality events in summer

Ecology 
The Barmah National Park is a river red gum forest, consisting of an upper storey of red gums, no shrub layer or middle storey, and a ground storey of native grasses, sedges and rushes. The edges of the forest merge into a eucalypt-box woodland.

The park is a large flood plain and wetland area, with flooding of the Murray River occurring sporadically, both naturally and due to flow regulation of the river.

Threatened species of flora found in Barmah National Park  may be listed under the DELWP Advisory List of Rare or Threatened Plants in Victoria, the Flora and Fauna Guarantee Act 1988 (FFG), or the Environment Protection and Biodiversity Conservation Act 1999 (EBPC). Many listed plant species do not have Wikipedia pages, more information can be found on the Vicflora database

{| class="wikitable sortable mw-collapsible mw-collapsed"
|+ class="nowrap" | List of threatened native flora occurring in Barmah National Park
|-
! scope="col" class="unsortable" | Image
! scope="col" style="width: 20%" | Scientific Name
! scope="col" style="width: 20%" | Common Name
! scope="col" | DELWP
! scope="col" | FFG
! scope="col" | EPBC
! scope="col" | Group
|-
|- Image || Scientific Name || Common Name || DELWP|| FFG || EPBC || Group
|-
|   || Allocasuarina luehmannii || buloke ||  e - endangered in Victoria ||  Listed as threatened in Victoria ||  ||  tree
|-
|  || Alternanthera nodiflora || common joyweed ||  k - poorly known in Victoria ||  ||  ||  forb
|-
|  || Alternanthera sp. 1 || plains joyweed ||  k - poorly known in Victoria ||  ||  ||  forb
|-
|  || Amyema linophylla subsp. orientale || buloke mistletoe ||  v - vulnerable in Victoria ||  ||  ||  hemiparasitic shrub
|-
|   || Ammannia multiflora || jerry-jerry ||  v - vulnerable in Victoria ||  ||  ||  forb
|-
|  || Amphibromus fluitans || river swamp wallaby-grass ||  v - vulnerable in Victoria ||  ||  VU - vulnerable in Australia ||  grass
|-
|  || Atriplex spinibractea || spiny-fruit saltbush ||  e - endangered in Victoria ||  ||  ||  forb
|-
|   || Brachyscome chrysoglossa || yellow-tongue daisy ||  v - vulnerable in Victoria ||  Listed as threatened in Victoria ||  ||  forb
|-
|  || Brachyscome muelleroides || Mueller daisy ||  e - endangered in Victoria ||  Listed as threatened in Victoria ||  VU - vulnerable in Australia ||  forb
|-
|  || Brachyscome readeri (listed as Brachyscome sp. aff. readeri) || Riverina daisy ||  v - vulnerable in Victoria ||  ||  ||  forb
|-
|  || Calotis cuneifolia || blue burr-daisy ||  r - rare in Victoria ||  ||  ||  forb
|-
|  || Cardamine moirensis || Riverina bitter-cress ||  r - rare in Victoria ||  ||  ||  forb
|-
|  || Cardamine tenuifolia || slender bitter-cress ||  k - poorly known in Victoria ||  ||  ||  forb
|-
|  || Centipeda nidiformis || cotton sneezeweed ||  r - rare in Victoria ||  ||  ||  forb
|-
|  || Coronidium gunnianum (listed as Coronidium scorpioides aff. rutidolepis (Lowland Swamps)) || pale swamp everlasting ||  v - vulnerable in Victoria ||  ||  ||  forb
|-
|  || Cullen parvum || small scurf-pea ||  e - endangered in Victoria ||  Listed as threatened in Victoria ||  ||  forb
|-
|   || Cymbonotus lawsonianus || bear's-ear ||  r - rare in Victoria ||  ||  ||  forb
|-
|  || Cynodon dactylon var. pulchellus || native couch ||  k - poorly known in Victoria ||  ||  ||  grass
|-
|  || Cyperus bifax || downs nutgrass ||  v - vulnerable in Victoria ||  ||  ||  sedge
|-
|   || Cyperus flaccidus || lax flat-sedge ||  v - vulnerable in Victoria ||  ||  ||  sedge
|-
|  || Cyperus victoriensis || yelka ||  k - poorly known in Victoria ||  ||  ||  sedge
|-
|   || Desmodium varians || slender tick-trefoil ||  k - poorly known in Victoria ||  ||  ||  forb
|-
|  || Dianella longifolia var. grandis (listed as Dianella sp. aff. longifolia (Riverina) || pale flax-lily ||  v - vulnerable in Victoria ||  ||  ||  forb
|-
|  || Digitaria ammophila || silky umbrella-grass ||  v - vulnerable in Victoria ||  ||  ||  grass
|-
|   || Eleocharis pallens || pale spike-sedge ||  k - poorly known in Victoria ||  ||  ||  sedge
|-
|  || Eragrostis exigua || slender love-grass ||  e - endangered in Victoria ||  ||  ||  grass
|-
|  || Fimbristylis aestivalis || summer fringe-sedge ||  k - poorly known in Victoria ||  ||  ||  sedge
|-
|  || Gratiola pumilo || dwarf brooklime ||  r - rare in Victoria ||  ||  ||  forb
|-
|  || Haloragis glauca f. glauca || bluish raspwort ||  k - poorly known in Victoria ||  ||  ||  forb
|-
|  || Hypsela tridens || hypsela ||  k - poorly known in Victoria ||  ||  ||  forb
|-
|  || Lepidium monoplocoides || winged peppercress ||  e - endangered in Victoria ||  Listed as threatened in Victoria ||  EN - endangered in Australia ||  forb
|-
|  || Lepidium pseudohyssopifolium || native peppercress ||  k - poorly known in Victoria ||  ||  ||  forb
|-
|  || Lipocarpha microcephala || button rush ||  v - vulnerable in Victoria ||  ||  ||  rush
|-
|  || Lotus australis var. australis || austral trefoil ||  k - poorly known in Victoria ||  ||  ||  forb
|-
|  || Minuria integerrima || smooth minuria ||  r - rare in Victoria ||  ||  ||  forb
|-
|   || Myoporum montanum || waterbush ||  r - rare in Victoria ||  ||  ||  shrub
|-
|   || Nymphoides crenata || wavy marshwort ||  v - vulnerable in Victoria ||  Listed as threatened in Victoria ||  ||  forb
|-
|  || Picris squarrosa || squat picris ||  r - rare in Victoria ||  ||  ||  forb
|-
|  || Ranunculus pumilio var. politus || ferny small-flower buttercup ||  k - poorly known in Victoria ||  ||  ||  forb
|-
|  || Rhodanthe stricta || slender sunray ||  e - endangered in Victoria ||  Listed as threatened in Victoria ||  ||  forb
|-
|  || Rorippa eustylis || dwarf bitter-cress ||  r - rare in Victoria ||  ||  ||  forb
|-
|  || Sclerolaena muricata var. semiglabra || dark roly-poly ||  k - poorly known in Victoria ||  ||  ||  shrub
|-
|  || Sida intricata || twiggy sida ||  v - vulnerable in Victoria ||  ||  ||  forb
|-
|  || Swainsona adenophylla || violet swainson-pea ||  e - endangered in Victoria ||  Listed as threatened in Victoria ||  ||  forb
|-
|   || Tripogonella loliiformis (listed as syn. Tripogon loliiformis) || rye beetle-grass ||  r - rare in Victoria ||  ||  ||  grass
|-
|  || Wahlenbergia tumidifructa || mallee annual-bluebell ||  r - rare in Victoria ||  ||  ||  forb
|}

 Fauna 
Threatened species of native fauna occurring in Barmah National Park  may be listed under the DELWP Advisory List of Threatened Vertebrate Fauna, the Flora and Fauna Guarantee Act 1988 (FFG), or the Environment Protection and Biodiversity Conservation Act 1999 (EBPC).

 Environmental threats 
Following European settlement of the area, land was extensively cleared to allow for farming and agriculture. Sheep and cattle grazing was a common sight around the Barmah region from the mid to late 1800s. The periodic burning previously undertaken by Indigenous Australians was also halted. Logging of the river red gum forests was an important part of the late 1800s and early 1900s.

A significant decrease in breeding and occurrence of waterbirds, particular woodland bird species and species of migratory birds has been reported in the Barmah National Park. This decrease has been attributed to the changes to the flood regimes occurring in the area.

A number of marsupial species are also no longer found within the park, including the rufous bettong, bridled nailtail wallaby, western barred bandicoot, and lesser stick-nest rat. Their absence has been attributed to the introduction of rabbits and foxes.

Though the future impact of climate change on river red gum forests is unknown, there has already been a significant dieback of trees in the area due to ongoing evapotranspiration deficits.

In the Murray-Darling Basin, prior to regulation of the Murray River, extensive Moira grass (Pseudoraphis spinescens) dominated floodplain marshes existed in areas that were typically seasonally flooded for 5–9 months duration in most years, to a minimum water depth of 0.5 m, and completely dry during late summer and autumn. Floodplain areas previously dominated by aquatic species, such as Moira grass, common reed (Phragmites australis), and cumbungi (Typha spp.), are now covered with species adapted to lower levels of flooding, mainly river red gums and giant rush (Juncus ingens).

The extent of the Moira grass-dominated plains has declined by 96 per cent over the last 80 years in the Barmah Forest, and they are predicted to be extinct in the Barmah Forest by 2026 without management intervention. Reductions in duration and depth of natural flooding due to regulation of the Murray River, grazing and trampling pressure by introduced animals, particularly by feral horses (and previously cattle), and invasive plant species are the main causes of this decline.

 Management 
The Barmah Forest was declared as a national park by the Victorian Government in 2010  under the National Parks Act 1975. The park is managed as part of a collaboration between Parks Victoria and the Traditional Owners of the area, including the Yorta Yorta people.

Flow regulation of the Murray River to benefit the surrounding agricultural land, has been undertaken for many years. However, more recently the importance of environmental flows is becoming increasingly acknowledged. Scientific study has shown that river red gums rely on specific levels and durations of floods in order to survive and regenerate, similarly waterbird species also have very specific flood-related conditions in order to successfully breed and fledge chicks. Flow regimes are also very important for native fish species populations. Therefore, the alterations to the management of river red gum forests and regulation of water flows within the Murray River will be a very important area of study into the future.

The timing and frequency of ecological burns will also need to be carefully monitored for future management of the park, as the increase in fire frequency predicted under climate change models may adversely impact bird habitat and may favour invasive plant and animal species.

Parks Victoria's plan to reverse environmental degradation and definitively improve management of Barmah National Park prioritises timing of seasonal flooding to promote the growth of floodplain vegetation and provides habitat for breeding waterbirds, control of invasive plants, and the eradication of introduced grazing animals including horses, deer, pigs and goats. The aims of management plans are to protect the floodplain marshes, including increasing the extent of Moira grass plains, and to improve the quality of habitat for native flora and fauna in the Barmah National Park.

 In the news 
In late 2018 and early 2019, during a nationwide drought, news reports began circulating about starving feral horses across Australia, including in Kosciuszko National Park, Guy Fawkes River National Park, and Barmah National Park. At Barmah, which at the time was flooded with environmental water, local activists the Barmah Brumby Preservation Group began feeding feral horses on properties adjacent to the national park. Within Barmah National Park, Parks Victoria began euthanising feral horses in very poor condition, under strict protocols, by shooting.

In April 2019, Parks Victoria announced a four year plan to cull an estimated more than 500 feral horses within the national park, along with controlling and eradicating other introduced plants and animals. Removal of 100-250 feral horses per year from the national park is proposed, with passive trapping and rehoming of some feral horses if homes can be pre-arranged, and the remainder to be shot by contracted professional shooters. After the fourth year, the plan will be reassessed, with the ultimate aim of removal of all feral horses from the national park.
Parks Victoria stated that:"the Victorian National Parks Act 1975  and other associated legislation does not allow for the ongoing presence of horses within the national park" ..."Failure to control and remove feral horses and other threats would fail to meet threatened species protection obligations under the Commonwealth Environment Protection and Biodiversity Conservation Act 1999 and the state Flora and Fauna Guarantee Act 1988." and "Difficult choices need to be made to reduce the severe degradation to the significant environmental values of Barmah National Park, and to address the animal welfare risks created by a burgeoning feral horse population that the park cannot sustain."

The local activists have disputed Parks Victoria's estimations of large numbers of feral horses within the national park, and opposed the rehoming or culling of any horses, stating that environmental flooding rather than overpopulation was responsible for the problems with the feral horses in the national park.

See also
 Barmah Forest virus''
 Protected areas of Victoria
 List of national parks of Australia
 Parks Victoria

References

Further reading

External links
 Parks Victoria: Barmah National Park
 Australian Wetlands Database: Ramsar wetlands: Barmah Forest

National parks of Victoria (Australia)
Protected areas established in 2010
Ramsar sites in Australia
Murray River
2010 establishments in Australia
Parks of Hume (region)